Youssef El Deeb (born 14 November 1954)  is an Egyptian-Canadian TV executive and award-winning film maker, book writer, director, producer, and childrenʼs book author. He founded Takhayal Entertainment and its flagship channel Fatafeat TV the first Arabic food network television channel, which was acquired by Discovery Communications in 2013.
 
He is the Managing Director of Mediagates which operates eight encrypted TV channels under the Alfa brand and available via OSN.  El Deeb used to be the CEO of the content creation company and Dubai-based film Picture Pond Media.

Early life and education

Born in Alexandria, El Deeb grew up in Canada, where he studied Fine Arts at the University of Victoria, and Film at Ryerson University. He is enrolled in the Berlin School of Creative Leadership EMBA program.

El Deeb is also an alumnus of the Royal Canadian Sea Cadets. He served at HMCS Quadra on Vancouver Island, British Columbia from 1970 to 1973 reaching the rank of Chief Petty Officer.

Career

Beginnings in film 
El Deeb's first job in film was as an Assistant Sound Editor with Gerald Durrell on the series entitled "The Amateur Naturalist"

Advertising 
In the 80s and 90s, El Deeb wrote, directed, and produced over 150 TV ads for major brands including: KFC, Baskin Robbins, TGI Fridays, Heinz Ketchup, Coca-Cola, Gillette, Sbarro, Hardee’s, Johnson & Johnson, BMW, Datsun and JVC.

Al-Ahram Weekly 
In the early 90s, El Deeb wrote many feature articles for the Al-Ahram Weekly newspaper including one with the late Begum Agha Khan in Aswan.

MBC 

In 2002, El Deeb joined The Middle East Broadcasting Center Group (MBC), the first private free-to-air satellite broadcasting company in the Arab World, as the Head of Production and Programming and Channel Manager of MBC1. He led the channel with its production facilities in London, Cairo, Beirut, Kuwait and Dubai.

Takhayal Entertainment 

El Deeb founded Takhayal Entertainment in 2006, a diversified film production and satellite broadcast entertainment company based in Dubai with an office in Heliopolis, Egypt. El Deeb served as the company's chairman for eight years before Discovery Communications acquired the company in 2013.
 
Takhayal owns and operates Fatafeat TV, the Middle East's top food network in over 55 million households in 21 Arabic-speaking countries. The network's library has over 700 hours of programming, also including a popular monthly magazine that is distributed across several MENA countries. Takhayal, which also has affiliates in Egypt, produces an additional 150 to 200 hours a year. Fatafeat airs both English and Arabic programs. Its English programs include Nigella Lawson, Jamie Oliver, Rachael Ray, Giada De Laurentiis, and Martha Stewart as well as Ace of Cakes and Barefoot Contessa hosted by Ina Garten. Fatafeat's Arabic lineup of shows includes Teslam El Ayadi, a family cooking show, Matbakhna El Arabi (Our Arabian Cuisine) hosted by award-winning chef Mohammad Orfali and Wala Bil Ahlam (Dream Desserts) from Egyptian award-winning chef Nermine Hanno
 
Takhayal also owns and publishes Martha Stewart Everyday Food, Martha Stewart Weddings Middle East, Burda Style Arabia and La Cucina Italiana Middle East. Takhayal and El Deeb hosted Stewart for a two-day visit in Dubai to promote her Fatafeat television cookery shows and regional magazine titles in 2011.

Takhayal Entertainment was sold to Discovery Networks in 2013, becoming the only indigenous Arab brand acquired by a global broadcaster. The move for Discovery meant further solidifying its reach in the Arabic-speaking world- the growing Middle East and North Africa television market. Mark Hollinger, CEO of Discovery Network International said, "Takhayal's executives, such as Youssef El-Deeb are exceptionally smart and creative and we look forward to working with them to leverage Takhayal's strong position in the Arab-speaking world."

Picture Pond 

In 2013, El Deeb founded Picture Pond, a Dubai-based film and TV content creation company.

Mediagates 

El Deeb joined Mediagates as Managing Director in early 2015. Mediagates, the former content wing of Orbit Communications Company now known as OSN

Films & Books

Youssef El Deeb produced his first Arabic feature film Al Abaa' Al Sighar starring Duraid Lahham and Hanan Tork. The film marked Lahham's return to cinema in the first family entertainment in the Arab world in the past 25 years.
 
The following year, El Deeb produced Uss Wa Lazk, which won the Best Film Award at the 2006 Cairo International Film Festival.

El Deeb wrote and directed 'Love's Improvisations' (Takaseem El Hob), an experimental Arabic feature film that premiered at the Dubai International Film Festival 2012. It was screened at the St. Tropez and Madrid film festivals. The film also won its lead talent 'Best Actor' at the London International Film Festival. 

In 2019 El Deeb published FEARLESS ME! A picture book for his toddler grandchildren and in 2020 launched Giddou.com a free children's education resource.

Appearances 
On the 21st of October 2020, El Deeb made a guest appearance on The Lighthouse Podcast, in a series of conversations aimed at introducing its audience to the Middle Eastern entrepreneurial landscape. During the interview, he was asked about his life journey, inspirations, successes and failures, and everything in-between. On the 13th of June 2022, El Deeb made another appearance on the What I Did Next Podcast during which he unpacked the peaks and troughs of his life and discussed the pivots that have shaped his journey.

References

External links
 
 Picture Pond Website
 Fatafeat Official Website
 Giddou Website

1954 births
Living people
Egyptian producers 
Television executives
Canadian television executives
Canadian people of Egyptian descent
University of Victoria alumni
Toronto Metropolitan University alumni